Joel Franklin LeBaron (June 9, 1923 – August 20, 1972) was a Mormon fundamentalist leader in northern Mexico. He was murdered by a member or members of a rival church which was headed by his brother Ervil LeBaron.

Early life
LeBaron was born in La Verkin, Utah, the eighth of 13 children born to Alma Dayer LeBaron, Sr. and Maude Lucinda McDonald. At the time of Joel's birth, the LeBaron family were members of the Church of Jesus Christ of Latter-day Saints (LDS Church). Joel was baptized into the LDS Church in 1931 in Colonia Juárez, Chihuahua, Mexico, where the LeBarons had moved when Joel was an infant.

Beginning in 1936, the LeBaron family became close to Joseph White Musser, a leader of the young Mormon fundamentalist movement in Mexico. In 1944, the family was excommunicated from the LDS Church for teaching and practicing plural marriage. For the next 11 years, the family were members of Rulon C. Allred's Apostolic United Brethren.

Church leadership

In 1955, Joel LeBaron and two of his brothers established the Church of the Firstborn of the Fulness of Times in Salt Lake City, Utah with Joel as President of the Church. Upon returning to northern Mexico, their parents and most of the members of the LeBaron family joined the new church. In 1967, Joel's brother Ervil LeBaron was removed from leadership in the church when he began to preach that he, and not Joel, was the proper leader of the church.

Murder
In 1972, Ervil LeBaron established the rival Church of the Lamb of God and began teaching his followers that in accordance with the doctrine of blood atonement, Joel had to be executed for his sins. On 20 August 1972, in Ensenada, Baja California, Mexico, one of Ervil's followers, Daniel Jordan (who was married to one of their nieces), shot Joel LeBaron in the head while Joel's young son was asleep in a car in the driveway. Ervil was tried and convicted in Mexico for Joel's murder, but the conviction was overturned. Ervil LeBaron was eventually convicted in Utah for ordering the killing of rival Mormon fundamentalist leader Rulon C. Allred. Joel LeBaron was succeeded as president of the church by his brother Verlan.

References
Janet Bennion (2004). Desert Patriarchy: Mormon and Mennonite Communities in the Chihuahua Valley (Tucson: University of Arizona Press) 
Ben Bradlee Jr. and Dale Van Atta (1981). Prophet of Blood: The Untold Story of Ervil Lebaron and the Lambs of God (New York: Putnam), 
Brian C. Hales (2006). Modern Polygamy and Mormon Fundamentalism: The Generations After the Manifesto (Salt Lake City, Utah: Greg Kofford Books) 
D. Michael Quinn, "Plural Marriage and Mormon Fundamentalism", Dialogue: A Journal of Mormon Thought, vol. 31, no. 2 (Summer 1998) pp. 1–68 at pp. 16–18, 23
Steven L. Shields (1990, 4th ed.). Divergent Paths of the Restoration (Independence, Mo.: Herald House) 
Lyle O. Wright (1963). Origins and Development of the Church of the Firstborn of the Fulness of Times. (M.S. thesis: Brigham Young University)

American Latter Day Saint leaders
Mexican Latter Day Saints
Mormon fundamentalist leaders
1923 births
1972 deaths
American people murdered abroad
Assassinated American people
Assassinated religious leaders
Deaths by firearm in Mexico
Latter Day Saint martyrs
People excommunicated by the Church of Jesus Christ of Latter-day Saints
People from Colonia Juárez, Chihuahua
People from Washington County, Utah
People murdered in Mexico
Religiously motivated violence in Mexico
Joel